"Children's March: Over the Hills and Far Away" was written by Percy Grainger as his first original work for band.

It was originally written between 1916 and 1918 as a piano showpiece for World War I relief efforts. However, after enlisting as a bandsman in the United States Army, he quickly orchestrated it for the 15th Coast Artillery Band stationed at Fort Hamilton. However, Grainger was discharged in January 1919 before he had a chance to play the piece with the band. The premiere of the piece occurred 6 June 1919 at Columbia University with the Goldman Band, Ralph Leopold on the piano, and Grainger conducting. An arrangement by Grainger for two pianos was later published in 1920 after a performance by Leopold and Grainger for the Red Cross on 2 December 1919.

The title is a reference to Over the Hills and Far Away by Frederick Delius, who was a close friend of Grainger.

Versions 
 Solo piano
 Two pianos, four hands
 Military band scored for:
 Woodwinds: Piccolo in D or C, 1st and 2nd Flutes; 1st and 2nd Oboes; Bass Oboe; E Clarinet; Solo B Clarinet; 1st, 2nd and 3rd B Clarinets; Alto Clarinet; Bass Clarinet; 1st and 2nd Bassoons; Soprano Saxophone; Alto Saxophone; Tenor Saxophone; Baritone Saxophone; Bass Saxophone
 Brass: Solo B Cornet, 1st, 2nd and 3rd B Cornet; 1st, 2nd, 3rd and 4th E Horns; 1st, 2nd and 3rd Trombones; Euphonium or Baritone; 1st and 2nd Tuba; String Bass; Contrabass Sarrusophone ad lib.
 Percussion: Snare Drum; Bass Drum; Cymbals; Gong; Woodblock; Tambourine; Castanets; Timpani in C and F; Glockenspiel; Xylophone
 Piano (ad lib.)

References

External links 

 
 Performance by the United States Marine Band

Compositions by Percy Grainger
Concert band pieces
1918 compositions